When the Young Wine Blossoms may refer to:

 When the Young Wine Blossoms (1927 film), a German silent comedy film
 When the Young Wine Blossoms (1943 film), a German comedy film